The 2012 Guia Race of Macau was the twelfth and final round of the 2012 World Touring Car Championship season and the eighth running of the Guia Race of Macau. It was held on 18 November 2012 at the Guia Circuit in the Chinese special administrative region of Macau. The race was part of the Macau Grand Prix weekend, headlined by the Formula Three event. Both races were won by Chevrolet in their final event as a works team; Yvan Muller won the first race and Alain Menu won the second race, while the team's third driver Robert Huff became series champion with second to Menu in the second race.

Background
At the previous round in the Race of China, Robert Huff had established himself as the solo championship leader. Norbert Michelisz was leading the Yokohama Independents' Trophy.

A number of local drivers joined the field for the race, Jo Merszei joined Liqui Moly Team Engstler in a naturally aspirated BMW 320si previously run in 2012 by Masaki Kano and Alex Liu. Andre Couto joined Tuenti Racing Team for his annual appearance at Macau. China Dragon Racing added a second Chevrolet Lacetti for Celio Alves Dias. RPM Racing Team ran a BMW 320si for Mak Ka Lok while Five Auto Racing Team ran a BMW 320si for Henry Ho and a Honda Accord Euro R for Eurico de Jesus. Italian former All-Japan Formula Three driver Kei Cozzolino made his maiden touring car appearance, replacing Alberto Cerqui at ROAL Motorsport.

This was to be the last race for Chevrolet as a works team in the WTCC having announced their departure from the series in July.

Report

Free Practice
Tiago Monteiro set the pace in the shortened Thursday test session, with Mehdi Bennani and Stefano D'Aste have initially set the pace. Cozzolino, Mak Ka Lok and Franz Engstler recovered from spins with relatively little damage, the session was however red flagged three minutes from the end when bamboo-engineering driver Darryl O'Young crashed head on into the barrier at the Mandarin Oriental corner.

Huff went quickest in Free Practice 1 on Friday, having spent much of the session trading times with team mates Muller and Menu and Honda Racing Team JAS driver Monteiro. O'Young was able to participate after his car was repaired overnight, Cozzolino damaged his car colliding with a barrier and Henry Ho was once again unable to run, this time due to a gearbox failure.

Huff led the Chevrolet trio in the second free practice session which distanced itself from the next nearest challenger, the Lukoil Racing SEAT León of Gabriele Tarquini, by 1.3 seconds. Damage sustained in the first free practice session meant Cozzolino did not get any running in for ROAL Motorsport, while Bennani and D'Aste had two separate near misses with the barriers.

Qualifying
Having led free practice, Huff dominated qualifying to claim his fourth pole position at Macau and extend his championship lead. He set a new lap record for the circuit in doing so, beating the record previously held by team mate Menu. Muller was second and Menu was third, with Tarquini fourth and Monteiro fifth in the new Honda Civic. O'Young took the independents' pole position with sixth place just ahead of Yokohama Trophy challengers Michelisz and Pepe Oriola. Fellow trophy challenger D'Aste could only manage 11th, setting a slightly slower time in Q2 than in Q1. Fredy Barth brought out the red flags when he crashed at Police bend, the stoppage hampering Tom Coronel's effort to progress to Q2. Six drivers set times slower than the 107% time in Q1, three of which had their times removed as a penalty for not reporting to the weighing bay. They were given permission to start the races from the back of the grid.

Warm-Up
Pole sitter Huff led the Sunday morning warm up session with Monteiro continuing to show potential in second and championship outsider Muller third. An off at the Melco hairpin for Barth brought out the yellow flags late in the otherwise undisturbed session.

Race One
Huff started on pole position but it was Muller who grabbed the lead for the first three laps while Monteiro grabbed fourth from Tarquini. A crash at Lisboa further down the field on the opening lap involving the Yokohama Trophy contenders block the track briefly, the leading six cars built a gap to the rest of the field after this. D'Aste was able to resume but was later issued with a black and orange flag due to the damage sustained in the accident. A move by Huff at Lisboa to take the lead demoted Muller to second on lap three for a short time before the race leader collided with a barrier and broke his suspension, promoting Muller back into the lead. Muller led the rest of the race to claim his ninth victory of the season ahead of Menu and Monteiro on his first podium appearance for Honda. O'Young finished as the independent winner having started from the class pole.

Race Two
Bamboo driver Alex MacDowall started from pole position on the reversed grid but a quick start by Michelisz soon put the Zengő Motorsport driver into the lead of the race. Menu made good progress from eighth and was soon up to fourth place behind Oriola, he got by the Tuenti Racing driver on the second lap. MacDowall reclaimed the lead from Michelisz but both drivers were easy targets for Menu who assumed the lead. MacDowall dropped to fourth where he remained until contact from Muller spun him into the barrier on the exit of the high speed Mandarin bend, Huff then took fourth off Muller. A long safety car period followed as work started to clear the debris from the collision, the race distance was extended and the action resumed on lap 8. Oriola out-braked himself going into Lisboa in a bid to pass Michelisz, putting them both in the barrier and bringing out the safety car for the second and final time. The race ended under the safety car with Chevrolet claiming a dominant 1–2–3 finish with Menu leading Huff and Muller. Huff secured his first World Touring Car Championship crown and Michelisz won the Yokohama Independents' Trophy despite not finishing the race.

Results

Qualifying

Bold denotes Pole position for second race.

Race 1

Bold denotes Fastest lap.

Race 2

Bold denotes Fastest lap.

Final championship standings

Drivers' Championship standings

Yokohama Independents' Trophy standings

Manufacturers' Championship standings

 Note: Only the top five positions are included for both sets of drivers' standings.

References

External links 

Macau